Russ Little may refer to:

 Russ Little, musician and member of Lighthouse
 Russ Little, political activist and member of the Symbionese Liberation Army